North Battleford may refer to:

 Rural Municipality of North Battleford No. 437, Saskatchewan, Canada
 North Battleford, Saskatchewan, Canada
 North Battleford Crown Colony, Saskatchewan, Canada; an unincorporated community
 North Battleford Comprehensive High School, in North Battleford, Saskatchewan, Canada
 North Battleford Energy Centre, natural gas power station in Saskatchewan, Canada
 North Battleford railway station, North Battleford, Saskatchewan, Canada
 North Battleford Airport (IATA: YQW; ICAO: CYQW) formerly the RCAF Station North Battleford
 North Battleford/Hamlin Airport (TC: CJD4) former airport in Saskatchewan, Canada
 North Battleford (electoral district) (1917-1949) former federal riding in Saskatchewan, Canada
 North Battleford (provincial electoral district) former provincial riding in Saskatchewan, Canada

See also
 Battleford (disambiguation)
 
 

Disambiguation pages